Rugby football is the collective name for the team sports of rugby union and rugby league.

Canadian football and, to a lesser extent, American football were once considered forms of rugby football, but are seldom now referred to as such. The governing body of Canadian football, Football Canada, was known as the Canadian Rugby Union as late as 1967, more than fifty years after the sport parted ways with rugby rules.

Rugby football started about 1845 at Rugby School in Rugby, Warwickshire, England, although forms of football in which the ball was carried and tossed date to the Middle Ages (see medieval football). Rugby football spread to other English public schools in the 19th century and across the British Empire as former pupils continued to play it.

Rugby football split into two codes in 1895, when twenty-one clubs from the North of England left the Rugby Football Union to form the Northern Rugby Football Union (renamed the Rugby Football League in 1922) at the George Hotel, Huddersfield, over payments to players who took time off work to play ("broken-time payments"), thus making rugby league the first code to turn professional and pay players. Rugby union turned professional one hundred years later, following the 1995 Rugby World Cup in South Africa. The respective world governing bodies are World Rugby (rugby union) and the Rugby League International Federation (rugby league).

Forms 

Following the 1895 split in rugby football, the two forms rugby league and rugby union differed in administration only. Soon the rules of rugby league were modified making limited tackle counts (6) and allowing for both teams shared possession of the football, resulting in two distinctly different forms of rugby.

The Olympic form of rugby is known as Rugby Sevens (based on rugby union format). In this form of the game, each team has seven players on the field at one time playing seven-minute halves. The rules and pitch size are the same as rugby union.

History

Antecedents of rugby 

Although rugby football was codified at Rugby School, many rugby playing countries had pre-existing football games similar to rugby.

Forms of traditional football similar to rugby have been played throughout Europe and beyond. Many of these involved handling of the ball, and scrummaging formations. For example, New Zealand had Ki-o-rahi, Australia marn grook, Japan kemari, Georgia lelo burti, the Scottish Borders Jeddart Ba' and Cornwall Cornish hurling, Central Italy Calcio Fiorentino, South Wales cnapan, East Anglia Campball, Ireland caid, an ancestor of Gaelic football, and France had La Soule.

Establishment of modern rugby 
In 1871, English clubs met to form the Rugby Football Union (RFU). In 1892, after charges of professionalism (compensation of team members) were made against some clubs for paying players for missing work, the Northern Rugby Football Union, usually called the Northern Union (NU), was formed. The existing rugby union authorities responded by issuing sanctions against the clubs, players, and officials involved in the new organization. After the schism, the separate clubs were named "rugby league" and "rugby union".

Global status of rugby codes

Rugby Union 

Rugby union is both a professional and amateur game, and is dominated by the first tier unions:  New Zealand, Ireland, Wales, England, South Africa, Australia, Argentina, Scotland, Italy, France and Japan. Second and third tier unions include Belgium, Brazil, Canada, Chile, Fiji, Georgia, Germany, Hong Kong, Kenya, Namibia, the Netherlands, Portugal, Romania, Russia, Samoa, Spain, Tonga, the United States and Uruguay. Rugby Union is administered by World Rugby (WR), whose headquarters are located in Dublin, Ireland. It is the national sport in New Zealand, Fiji, Samoa, Tonga, Georgia, Wales and Madagascar, and is the most popular form of rugby globally. The Olympic Games have admitted the seven-a-side version of the game, known as Rugby sevens, into the programme from Rio de Janeiro in 2016 onwards. There was a possibility sevens would be a demonstration sport at the 2012 London Olympics but many sports including sevens were dropped.

The premier international competition is the Rugby World Cup. Currently there are four major domestic professional leagues globally:

 Premiership Rugby:
  England (13 teams)
 Super Rugby:
  Australia (5 teams)
  Fiji (1 team)
  New Zealand (5 teams)
 Pacific Islands (1 team)
 Top 14:
  France (14 teams)
 United Rugby Championship:
  Ireland (4 teams)
  Italy (2 teams)
  Scotland (2 teams)
  South Africa (4 teams) 
  Wales (4 teams)

Rugby League 
Rugby league is also both a professional and amateur game, administered on a global level by the Rugby League International Federation. In addition to amateur and semi-professional competitions in the United States, Russia, Lebanon, Serbia, Europe and Australasia, there are two major professional competitions—the Australasian National Rugby League and the Super League. International Rugby League is dominated by Australia, England and New Zealand, though Tonga and Samoa have threatened this hegemony regularly since 2017. In Papua New Guinea, it is the national sport. Other nations from the South Pacific and Europe also play in the Pacific Cup and European Cup respectively.

The premier international competition is the Rugby League World Cup, which is contested quadrennially. The premier international club comeptition is the World Club Challenge, which is contested annually in February. Currently there are two major domestic professional leagues globally:

 National Rugby League:
  Australia (16 teams)
  New Zealand (1 team)
 Super League:
  England (11 teams)
  France (1 team)
  Wales (currently no teams, part of system)

Gridiron Football 
In Canada and the United States, rugby developed into gridiron football. During the late 1800s (and even the early 1900s), the two forms of the game were very similar (to the point where the United States was able to win the gold medal for rugby union at the 1920 and 1924 Summer Olympics), but numerous rule changes have differentiated the gridiron-based game from its rugby counterpart, introduced by Walter Camp in the United States and John Thrift Meldrum Burnside in Canada. Among unique features of the North American game are 
 the separation of play into downs instead of releasing the ball immediately upon tackling
 the requirement that the team with the ball set into a set formation for at least one second before resuming play after a tackle (and the allowance of up to 40 seconds to do so)
 the allowance for one forward pass from behind the site of the last tackle on each down
 the evolution of hard plastic equipment (particularly the football helmet and shoulder pads)
 a smaller and pointier ball that is favorable to being passed but makes drop kicks impractical
 a generally smaller and narrower field measured in customary units instead of metric (in some variants of the American game a field can be as short as 50 yards between end zones)
 a distinctive field (shaped like a gridiron, from which the code's nickname is derived) with lines marked in five-yard intervals
Worldwide, there are two major professional leagues of gridiron football, both domestic:

 National Football League:
  United States (32 teams)
 Canadian Football League:
  Canada (9 teams)

Rules 

Distinctive features common to both rugby codes include the use of an oval ball and the prohibition of the forward pass. Due to the prohibition, players can gain ground only by running with the ball or by kicking it. Furthermore, unlike American and Canadian football, neither league nor union players wear any sort of protection or armour. 

The two rugby codes differ as the result of changes made to the rules of rugby league. League implemented these changes with the aim of making a faster-paced and more try-oriented game than rugby union. 

The main differences between the two games, besides league having teams of 13 players and union of 15, involve the tackle and its aftermath:
 Union players contest possession following the tackle: depending on the situation, either a ruck or a maul can occur. League players may not contest possession after making a tackle: play is continued with a play-the-ball.
 In league, if the team in possession fails to score before a set of six tackles, it surrenders possession. Union has no six-tackle rule; a team can keep the ball for an unlimited number of tackles before scoring as long as it maintains possession and does not commit an offence.

Set pieces of the union code include the scrum and the line-out. The scrum occurs after a minor infringement of the rules (most often a knock-on, when a player knocks the ball forward). After an infringement, packs of opposing players "scrum" or push against each other for possession. In a line-out, parallel lines of players from each team, arranged perpendicular to the touch-line, attempt to catch the ball thrown from touch. A rule has been added to line-outs which allows the jumper to be pulled down once a players' feet are on the ground.

In the league code, the scrum still exists albeit with greatly reduced importance. In league, the scrum involves fewer players and is rarely contested. Set pieces are generally started from the play-the-ball situation. 

Many of the rugby league positions have names and requirements similar to rugby union positions. Notably, however, there are no flankers in rugby league.

Culture

Home countries 
In England, rugby union is widely regarded as an "establishment" sport, played mostly by members of the upper and middle classes. For example, many pupils at public schools and grammar schools play rugby union, although the game (which had a long history of being played at state schools until the 1980s) is becoming increasingly popular in comprehensive schools. Despite this stereotype, the game, particularly in the West Country is popular amongst all classes. In contrast, rugby league has traditionally been seen as a working-class pursuit. Another exception to rugby union's upper-class stereotype is in Wales, where it has been traditionally associated with small village teams made up of coal miners and other industrial workers who played on their days off. On Ireland, both rugby union and rugby league are unifying forces across the national and sectarian divide, with the Ireland international teams representing both political entities.

In Australia, support for both codes is concentrated in New South Wales, Queensland and the Australian Capital Territory (55% of the population), though rugby league is far more popular. The same perceived class barrier as exists between the two games in England also occurs in these states, fostered by rugby union's prominence and support at private schools.

Exceptions to the above include New Zealand (although rugby league is still considered to be a lower class game by many or a game for 'westies' referring to lower class western suburbs of Auckland and more recently, southern Auckland where the game is also dominant), Wales, France (except Paris), Cornwall, Gloucestershire, Somerset, Scottish Borders, County Limerick (see Munster Rugby) and the Pacific Islands, where rugby union is popular in working class communities. Nevertheless, rugby league is perceived as the game of the working-class people in northern England and in the Australian states of New South Wales and Queensland.

In the United Kingdom, rugby union fans sometimes used the term "rugger" as an alternative name for the sport (see Oxford '-er'), although this archaic expression has not had currency since the 1950s or earlier. New Zealanders refer to rugby union simply as either "rugby" or "union", or even simply "football", and to rugby league as "rugby league" or "league". In the U.S., people who play rugby are sometimes called "ruggers", a term little used elsewhere except facetiously.

Internationally 
There is a strong tradition of rugby union in France, particularly in the Basque, Occitan and Catalan areas along the border with Spain. The game is very popular in South Africa, having been introduced by English-speaking settlers in the 19th century. British colonists also brought the game with them to Australia and New Zealand, where the game is widely played. It has spread since to much of Polynesia, having particularly strong followings in Fiji, Samoa, and Tonga. Rugby union continues to grow in the Americas and parts of Asia as well.

Injuries 
About a quarter of rugby players are injured in each season.

Being a high contact sport, rugby union has the highest announced rates of concussions and outside England also has the highest number of catastrophic injuries out of any team sport. Research finding that during match play, concussion was reported at a higher level, and during training at a lower level, but still at a higher level than most players of another sport to receive.

Rugby ball 

A rugby ball is a diamond shape ball used for easier passing.
Richard Lindon and Bernardo Solano started making balls for Rugby school out of hand stitched, four-panel, leather casings and pigs' bladders. The rugby ball's distinctive shape is supposedly due to the pig's bladder, although early balls were more plum-shaped than oval. The balls varied in size in the beginning depending upon how large the pig's bladder was.

In rugby union, World Rugby regulates the size and shape of the ball under Law 2 (also known as Law E.R.B); an official rugby union ball is oval and made of four panels, has a length in-line of 280–300 millimetres, a circumference (end to end) of 740–770 millimetres, and a circumference (in width) of 580–620 millimetres. It is made of leather or suitable synthetic material and may be treated to make it water resistant and easier to grip. The rugby ball may not weigh more than 460 grams or less than 410 and has an air pressure of 65.71–68.75 kilopascals, or 0.67–0.70 kilograms per square centimetre, or 9.5–10.0 lbs per square inch. Spare balls are allowed under the condition that players or teams do not seek an advantage by changing the ball. Smaller sized balls may also be used in games between younger players.
Much larger versions of traditional balls are also available for purchase, but these are mainly for their novelty attraction.

World Cups 

The Rugby League World Cup was the first World Cup of either of the Rugby codes and was first held in France in 1954, and as of 2013 occurs on a 4-year cycle. It is an international tournament that is organized by the Rugby League International Federation. The event is played in the league format and features the top 16 teams from around the world. Australia won the 2017 Rugby League World Cup, played in Australia, New Zealand and Papua New Guinea. The Kangaroos backed this up by winning the 2021 tournament also.

The Rugby World Cup, which was first held in New Zealand and Australia in 1987, occurs every four years.  It is an international tournament organized by World Rugby. The event is played in the union format and features the top 20 teams from around the world. South Africa won the 2019 Rugby World Cup, which was played in Japan. Since 2013, the two World Cups alternate every two years during the four-year period.

Rugby shirt 

Rugby shirts were formerly entirely made of cotton but are now made of synthetic fabric. This material has the advantage of not absorbing as much water or mud as cotton.  Owing to the more aggressive nature of the game, rugby clothing, in general, is designed to be much more robust and hardwearing than that worn for association football.

The rugby jerseys are slightly different depending on the type of rugby game played. The shirts worn by rugby league footballers commonly have a large "V" around the neck. The players in rugby union wear jerseys with a more traditional design, sometimes completely white (Cahors Rugby in France). The number of the player and his or her surname are placed on the upper back of the jersey (often name above number, with the number being significantly larger and more central), and the logo of the team on the upper left chest.

Rugby betting 

With the popularity of rugby over the years, many betting establishments have made it possible for viewers of the game to place wagers on games.  The various types of wagers that can be placed on games vary, however, the main types of bets that can be placed are as follows:
 Fixed-odds betting
 Futures/Outright Bets
 Prop Bets / Specials
 Over/Under Bets

Like most team sports, both forms of rugby are vulnerable to match-fixing, particularly bets involving easily manipulated outcomes such as conceding penalties and first point scorer. A recent example is a deliberate infringement by Ryan Tandy in order for the first points scored to be a penalty goal in a 2010 NRL match; the attempt backfired when instead of taking a shot at goal, a try was scored.

See also
College rugby

References

External links

Rugby's Most Unfortunate Faces —slideshow by Life magazine
Video on the Basics of Rugby Union
Full Guide of Rugby World Cup 2019 in Japan

 
Games and sports introduced in the 19th century
Rugby School
Team sports